The Battle of Paris may refer to:

Battle of Paris (1814), military engagement during the Napoleonic Wars
Battle of Paris, nickname for a football match played between Paris Saint-Germain and Olympique de Marseille on 13 September 2020
Liberation of Paris (1944), military engagement during the Second World War

See also
Paris attacks (disambiguation)
Siege of Paris (disambiguation)